The Very Beast Of G.G.F.H. Vol. 1 is a compilation album by the industrial techno band G.G.F.H. This album is a CD only compilation of tracks from their back catalogue.  The only track that is new is Bullet, which was recorded by DJ Ghost as a taster for an album that did not happen, as dealings with Peaceville Records fell through.  A second volume was never made, although DJ Ghost himself has stated that he owns the master copy and it may yet see the light of day.

Track listing

 "Flesh" (5:16)
 "Acid" (2:07)
 "Bullet (2001 Version)" (6:31)
 "Eclipse" (3:17)
 "Room 213 (Frozen Heart Mix)" (4:25)
 "Welcome To The Process" (4:45)
 "Night Prowler" (3:17)
 "Hoe Or Die (’87 Demo)" (2:57)
 "Dead Men Don’t Rape (Revenge Mix)" (4:22)
 "Fiending Corpse" (3:55)
 "Nothing Left Inside" (4:20)

This CD also includes the video for Real

Personnel
DJ Ghost (aka Michael Geist) - Vocals/Programming
Brian J. Walls -  Guitars/Synths

2001 greatest hits albums
G.G.F.H. albums